Willow Dawson is a Canadian cartoonist and illustrator, whose works include The Big Green Book of the Big Blue Sea with author Helaine Becker (Kids Can Press), Hyena in Petticoats: The Story of Suffragette Nellie McClung (Penguin Books Canada), Lila and Ecco's Do-It-Yourself Comics Club (Kids Can Press), 100 Mile House (excerpts on Top Shelf Comics 2.0), the graphic novel No Girls Allowed, with author Susan Hughes (Kids Can Press), and Violet Miranda: Girl Pirate, with author Emily Pohl-Weary (Kiss Machine). Her works have been supported by the Canada Council for the Arts, the Ontario Arts Council, and the Toronto Arts Council.Broken Pencil has called her black and white art style wonderful, bold, and full of thought. Dawson also creates painted stand-alone illustrations which she turns into prints and sells on her Society6 site. The original art is created using acrylic ink and paint on recycled cardboard. Her illustrations convey a mood of whimsy and playful-uncanny. Her work typically exhibits flowing linework and favors a 50's color palette.She is a member of The RAID Studio, The Writers' Union of Canada, Illustration Mundo, and JacketFlap.Dawson was born in 1975 and grew up in Vancouver, British Columbia. She currently lives in a creaky-old-house-turned-music-school in downtown Toronto.

Growing Up
Dawson grew up in the area of Kitsilano, in Vancouver, British Columbia. As a child with asthma, she spent a lot of time in hospital where she started to draw and make art. She credits her father, artist Clif Dawson, as her best friend, a continued source of inspiration, and the reason she got into art in the first place. Her last name means "son of the jackdaw (blackbird)". Dawson and her father share a love of and fascination with flight, including birds (particularly crows) and airplanes.Her parents purchased  of forest in 100 Mile House, British Columbia before she was born. Her father built a large cabin on a ridge and the family spent their summers there until the mid-late 1980s.

Art School
Dawson moved to Toronto in the late 1990s. She studied illustration at the Ontario College of Art and Design.Shortly before graduating, Dawson was approached by Kids Can Press to illustrate their upcoming project, eventually titled No Girls Allowed: Tales of Daring Women Dressed as Men for Love, Freedom and Adventure. She has been illustrating children's books and graphic novels ever since.

Comics career
Dawson began her comics career by publishing 'zines and mini comics in the late 1990s and early 2000s. She eventually moved on to bigger projects, including the comic book Mother May I with Sarrah Young (Eve's Plum Press, 2003), submissions in the anthology Girls Who Bite Back: Witches, Mutants, Slayers and Freaks (Sumach Press, 2004), and Drawing the Line (DTL Press, 2004).

Small 
Her autobiographical comic Small in the anthology Drawing the Line (DTL Press, 2004) is about the severity of her asthma through the years and the family's decision to try Homeopathy. This story spawned an interest in exploring more biographical and autobiographical material.

Let's Talk About It 
In 2005, Dawson was commissioned to create comic strips for Deepa Mehta's documentary Let's Talk About It, a film about domestic violence with an emphasis on immigrant families. The strips were used as section breaks and to illustrate key moments. The film aired on Omni TV in several languages.

Violet Miranda: Girl Pirate 
Through Girls Who Bite Back, she met collaborator and author, Emily Pohl-Weary. The pair were dissatisfied with the female protagonist's role in the first Pirates of the Caribbean movie and set to work creating a more realistic depiction of female pirates. The series Violet Miranda: Girl Pirate was a 4-issue comic book series published by Kiss Machine from 2005 to 2008, which drew inspiration from the lives of Anne Bonney and Mary Read, two of history's most infamous female pirates.

No Girls Allowed 
Dawson illustrated the 2008 graphic novel, No Girls Allowed, written by author Susan Hughes and published by Kids Can Press. The book tells several stories of different women across the globe and through history who dressed as men for various reasons. No Girls Allowed has received positive press, including rave reviews on Boing-Boing, National Post, and the School Library Journal. In 2008, the book received an Ontario Library Association's Best Bet for Junior Non-Fiction Award. It has since been nominated for The Cybils Graphic Novel Award, The Joe Shuster Comics for Kids Award, ForeWord's Book of the Year Award, and the Norma Fleck Award For Canadian Children's Non-Fiction.

Lila and Ecco's Do-It-Yourself Comics Club 
Dawson's editor asked if she had any desire to create a how-to book on making comics for kids. Dawson created Lila and Ecco's Do-It-Yourself Comics Club, the story of three characters who learn, over the course of this 100-page graphic novel, how to make their own comics. The character of Lila's mother is based on Dawson's homeopath, Laurie Dack from the Vancouver Centre For Homeopathy. The character of Ruby is based on Dawson's own sister, Shayla Dawson. Lila's artwork is inspired by the author's niece, Gabrielle McKenzie. This book received funding from the Ontario Arts Council through the Writers' Reserve Program.

Hyena in Petticoats: The Story of Suffragette Nellie McClung 
Dawson was approached by Penguin Canada (through her first agent) to create a historical graphic novel about Nellie McClung, Canada's most outspoken suffragette who is credited with getting women the vote and (along with the other members of "The Famous Five") getting women officially recognized as "persons" under the Act. Since McClung felt that her time on the farm was the underpinning to her political and literary success, Dawson wanted the design of the book to mirror the design aesthetic at the turn of the century during the suffragette's formative years. She created page borders with banners inspired by the covers of 1900s farming catalogues and tiny, moving animals reflecting the theme of each chapter. This book was reviewed in CM Magazine  and Quill & Quire  and others. This book also received support from the Ontario Arts Council's Writers' Reserve Program.

The Big Green Book of the Big Blue Sea 
Dawson illustrated this science textbook which was written by Helaine Becker for Kids Can Press. The book contains science experiments about the ocean with an environmental message.

Susanna Moodie: Roughing it in the Bush 
Dawson was introduced to Patrick Crowe, the author of Susanna Moodie: Roughing it in the Bush, by publisher Chester Brown, and worked with Selena Goulding to illustrate the graphic novel. The novel is the story of Susanna Moodie, an early settler of Canada, and her experiences upon arriving in Canada. Originally written as a screenplay by Carol Shields, it was later adapted into a graphic novel by Dawson and Crowe after Shields' death.

100 Mile House 
Dawson is currently working on a semi-autobiographical graphic novel called 100 Mile House (excerpts published at Top Shelf Comix 2.0). The series is set in the woods of 100 Mile House, British Columbia and focuses on her friendship with her father, his influence on her artistic development, and their shared love of the land.

Awards
Dawson won the 2008 Ontario Library Association's Best Bet for Junior Non-Fiction for No Girls Allowed with Susan Hughes, published by Kids Can Press.

Nominations
 2008 Cybils Graphic Novel Award: No Girls Allowed with Susan Hughes (Kids Can Press)
 2008 Joe Shuster Comics for Kids Award: No Girls Allowed with Susan Hughes (Kids Can Press)
 2008 ForeWord's Book of the Year Award: No Girls Allowed with Susan Hughes (Kids Can Press)
 2008 Norma Fleck Award For Canadian Children's Non-Fiction: No Girls Allowed with Susan Hughes (Kids Can Press)

Book Tours
Dawson toured Prince Edward Island for the 2012 TD Children's Book Week.

Bibliography
Upcoming:
100 Mile House (Top Shelf Comics, ongoing from 2008)

Science Books:
The Big Green Book of the Big Blue Sea (Kids Can Press, 2012)

Graphic Novels:
Hyena in Petticoats: The Story of Suffragette Nellie McClung (Penguin Books Canada, 2011)
Lila and Ecco's Do-It-Yourself Comics Club (Kids Can Press, 2010)
No Girls Allowed: Tales of Daring Women Dressed as Men for Love, Freedom and Adventure (Kids Can Press, 2008)

Anthologies:
Girls Who Bite Back: Witches, Mutants, Slayers and Freaks "Levitation Girl in Good Afternoon America!" (Sumach Press, 2004)
Drawing the Line "Small" (DTL Press, 2004)
Comics Festival "Ella and Squid" (Legion of Evil Press, 2009)

Small press comics:
Violet Miranda: Girl Pirate (Kiss Machine, 2005–2008)
Mother May I (Eve's Plum Press, 2003)

Self-Published Work:
The Innumerable Obsessions of Purl McGee (2006)

Illustration clients
McGraw-Hill Ryerson Ltd., Owl Magazine, Kids Can Press, Top Shelf Comics, Penguin Canada, YWCA Canada, LGBTQ Parenting Network, Metaviews, Jesse Hirsh, Filmblanc, Shameless Magazine, Sumach Press, Kiss Machine.

References

External links
 
 Dawson's Art Prints
 Willow Dawson's Sketchblog
 
 The RAID Studio
 Willow Dawson on Top Shelf Comix
 Hyena in Petticoats
 Kids Can Press presents Willow Dawson
 Kiss Machine presents
 Toronto Comic Arts Festival
 Willow Dawson at Writers' Union of Canada
 
 Illustration Mundo

Artists from Vancouver
Canadian cartoonists
Canadian children's book illustrators
Living people
Year of birth missing (living people)